Rafalivka is an urban-type settlement in Varash Raion (district) of Rivne Oblast (province) in western Ukraine. Its population is 3,278 as of the 2001 Ukrainian Census. Current population: 

The settlement was founded in 1902 as poz'izd Polytsi. Its name was changed to Nova Rafalivka in 1927. The settlement's name was again changed to its current "Rafalivka" when it acquired the status of an urban-type settlement in 1957.

See also
 Volodymyrets, the other urban-type settlement in Volodymyrets Raion of Rivne Oblast

References

Further reading
 Online translation of 

Urban-type settlements in Varash Raion
Wołyń Voivodeship (1921–1939)
Populated places established in 1902